Hiebel is a surname. Notable people with the surname include:

Adelaide Hiebel (1885–1965), American artist and illustrator 
Friedrich Hiebel (1903–1989), Austrian anthroposophist, journalist, and writer

See also
Hebel (disambiguation)
Hieb